Clearfield Township is the name of some townships in the United States: 

 Clearfield Township, North Dakota
 Clearfield Township, Butler County, Pennsylvania
 Clearfield Township, Cambria County, Pennsylvania

Township name disambiguation pages